Eric Brown (born 24 May 1960) is a British science fiction author.

Biography 
Eric Brown was born in Haworth, Yorkshire, in May 1960, and began writing in 1975. In the 1980s he travelled extensively throughout Greece and Asia (some of his novels are set in India). His first publication was in 1982, when his play for children Noel's Ark appeared.

His career took off in the late 1980s with a succession of short stories in the magazine Interzone and other publications. His story "The Time-Lapsed Man" won the Interzone readers' poll for the most admired story of 1988, and an Eastercon short text award in 1995. He was voted the Best New European SF writer of the Year in the early 1990s and has subsequently won the British Science Fiction Award twice (for the short stories "Hunting the Slarque" in 1999 and  "Children of Winter" in 2001).

He has publicly admired the science fiction writing of Michael G. Coney, Robert Silverberg, Richard Paul Russo and Robert Charles Wilson, amongst others.

Bibliography

Novels 
 Meridian Days. London: Pan, 1992 (paper). 
 Engineman. London: Pan, 1994 (paper). 
 Penumbra. London: Millennium, 1999 (paper). 
 the Virex trilogy
 New York Nights. London: Gollancz, 2000. 
 New York Blues. London: Gollancz, 2001. 
 New York Dreams. London: Gollancz, 2004 (paper). 
 Bengal Station. Waterville, ME: Five Star Books, 2004. 
 Helix. Nottingham: Solaris Books, 2007 (paper). 
 Kéthani. Nottingham: Solaris Books, 2008 (paper). 
 Bengal Station
 Necropath. Nottingham: Solaris Books, 2009 (paper). 
 Xenopath. Nottingham: Solaris Books, 2010 (paper). 
 Cosmopath. Nottingham: Solaris Books, 2010 (paper). 
 Engineman. Nottingham: Solaris Books, 2010 (paper). 
 Guardians of the Phoenix. Nottingham: Solaris Books, 2010 (paper). 
 The Kings of Eternity. Nottingham: Solaris Books, 2011 (paper). 
 Weird Space: The Devil's Nebula. Abaddon, 2012 (paper).  
 Helix Wars. Nottingham: Solaris Books, 2012 (paper). 
 Serene Invasion. Abaddon, 2013 (paper).  
 Weird Space: Satan's Reach. Abaddon, 2013 (paper).  
 Weird Space: The Baba Yaga. Abaddon, 2015 (paper).

Novellas 
 A Writer's Life. Harrogate: PS Publishing, 2001. 
 Approaching Omega. Tolworth, Surrey: Telos Publishing, 2005. 
 The Extraordinary Voyage of Jules Verne. Harrogate: PS Publishing, 2005. 
 Gilbert and Edgar on Mars. Hornsea: PS Publishing, 2009. 
 Starship
 Starship Summer. Harrogate: PS Publishing, 2007. 
 Starship Fall. Harrogate: NewCon Press, 2009. 
 Starship Winter. Harrogate: PS Publishing, 2012.  
 Starship Spring. Harrogate: PS Publishing, 2012. 
 Starship Coda.  Harrogate: PS Publishing, 2016. 
 The Telemass Quartet
 Famadihana on Fomalhaut IV. Harrogate: PS Publishing, 2014. 
 Sacrifice on Spica III. Harrogate: PS Publishing, 2014. 
 Reunion on Alpha Reticuli II. Harrogate: PS Publishing, 2016. 
 Exalted on Bellatrix 1. Harrogate: PS Publishing, 2017. 
 Telemass Coda.  Harrogate: PS Publishing, 2019. 
 The Kon-tiki Quartet, with Keith Brooke
 Dislocations.  Harrogate: PS Publishing, 2018. 
 Parasites.  Harrogate: PS Publishing, 2018. 
 Insights.  Harrogate: PS Publishing, 2019.

Collections 
 The Time-Lapsed Man and Other Stories. London: Pan, 1990 (paper). 
 Blue Shifting. London: Pan, 1995 (paper). 
 Parallax View, with Keith Brooke. Mountain Ash, Wales: Sarob Press, 2000. 
 Deep Future. Canton, OH: Cosmos Books, 2001. 
 The Fall of Tartarus. London: Gollancz, 2005 (paper). 
 Threshold Shift. Urbana, IL: Golden Gryphon Press, 2006. 
 Parallax View, with Keith Brooke. Stafford: Immanion Press, 2007 (paper). 
 Salvage. Infinity Plus Books, 2013 (paper).
 Starship Seasons. Harrogate: PS Publishing, 2013.  - A collection of the first four Starship novellas.

Children's Books 
 The Web
 Untouchable. London: Dolphin, 1997 (paper). 
 Walkabout. London: Dolphin, 1999 (paper). 
 Twocking. Edinburgh: Barrington Stoke, 2002 (paper). 
 Firebug. Edinburgh: Barrington Stoke, 2003 (paper). 
 British Front. Edinburgh: Barrington Stoke, 2005 (paper). 
 Space Ace. Edinburgh: Barrington Stoke, 2005 (paper). 
 Crazy Love. Edinburgh: Barrington Stoke, 2006 (paper). 
 Revenge (Most Wanted). Edinburgh: Barrington Stoke, 2007 (paper).

References

External resources
 Official website
 
 Eric Brown's online fiction at Free Speculative Fiction Online
 Infinity Plus has a short profile of Eric Brown, as well as an interview conducted by Keith Brooke and an earlier conversation between the two, and Brooke's introduction to Brown's collection Deep Future.
Fantastic Fiction page on Eric Brown
Ghostwriting review
Serene Invasion review
Eric Brown : Story behind The Serene Invasion - Online Essay at Upcoming4.me
Eric Brown : Story behind Satan's Reach - Online Essay at Upcoming4.me
Eric Brown : Story behind Salvage - Online Essay at Upcoming4.me
Eric Brown : Story behind Murder by the Book - Online Essay at Upcoming4.me
The story behind Jani and the Greater Game - Essay by Eric Brown at Upcoming4.me

English science fiction writers
1960 births
Living people
People from Haworth
English male novelists